Garmisch-Partenkirchen (Bavarian: Garmasch-Partakurch) is a Landkreis (district) in Bavaria, Germany. It is bounded by (from the west and clockwise) the districts of Ostallgäu, Weilheim-Schongau and Bad Tölz-Wolfratshausen, and by the Austrian state of Tyrol.

History
In medieval times the alpine lands were owned by the bishops of Freising and the abbots of Ettal Abbey. In 1803, when the clerical states of Germany were dissolved, the region was acquired by Bavaria.

Geography
The district is located in the Bavarian Alps and includes the highest mountain of Germany, the Zugspitze (2962 m). The highest peaks are grouped along the Austrian border, where the mountain ridges of the Wettersteingebirge and the Karwendelgebirge rise. Between them the Isar river runs northwards. North of these ridges there is a valley housing the tourist resort of Garmisch-Partenkirchen. The valley together with the surrounding mountains is called the Werdenfelser Land. Further north the ridges of the Ammergebirge and the Estergebirge rise, which are still over 2000 m high. In the northernmost parts of the district there is alpine uplands (about 600 m high). Here the Staffelsee is located, a lake of 8 km².

Coat of arms
The coat of arms displays:
 a lion with the head of a griffin, being the symbol of Steingaden Abbey
 a portrait of a moor, often used in European coats of arms (https://blackcentraleurope.com/sources/1000-1500/moors-on-crests/
 the white and blue checked pattern of Bavariahttps:

Towns and municipalities

The district includes no towns. All places have the status of municipalities.

References

External links

Garmisch Partenkirchen , City Guide on Garmisch Partenkirchen Germany
 Official website (German)
 Regional news platform for the Landkreis Garmisch-Partenkirchen (German)
 Zugspitze (German, English)

 
Districts of Bavaria